The 1956–57 season was Cardiff City F.C.'s 30th season in the Football League. They competed in the 22-team Division One, then the first tier of English football, finishing twenty-first, suffering relegation to Division Two.

Players

League standings

Results by round

Fixtures and results

First Division

FA Cup

Welsh Cup

See also
List of Cardiff City F.C. seasons

References

Welsh Football Data Archive

Cardiff City F.C. seasons
Association football clubs 1956–57 season
Card